"Pineapple" is a song by Colombian singer-songwriter Karol G. It was written by Karol G, Mauricio Reglero, Ricardo Reglero and Sky Rompiendo, and produced by the latter. The song was released on March 1, 2018 through Universal Music Latino, as lead single from her second studio album Ocean.

Background 
The song was first teased a month prior to its official release through Karol G’s social media accounts, with multiple snippets of the song and lyrics used in captions. The song was officially announced on February 25, 2018, with its release date and cover art revealed. The song was released on March 1, 2018.

Critical reception 

Suzette Fernandez from Billboard referred to the song as "that seductive/urban line that characterizes Karol G."

Chart performance 

"Pineapple" debuted and peaked at number 49 on the US Billboard Hot Latin Songs chart dated March 17, 2018. It charted for one week.

Awards and nominations

Music video 

The music video for "Pineapple" was directed by Harold from 36 Grados and was released on Karol G’s YouTube channel on March 1, 2018. As of January 2023, it has over 280 million views and 1.7 million likes.

Charts

Certifications

References

2018 songs
2018 singles
Karol G songs
Spanish-language songs